Edwards Ltd is a British, multinational vacuum and ultra-high vacuum pump  manufacturer. It is based in Burgess Hill and has been a subsidiary of Atlas Copco since 2014.

Edwards holds 1,700 patents, including for dry (oil-free) vacuum pumps, and produces equipment used for manufacturing semiconductors;  scientific research; freeze drying, and in other industries. Its pumps remove contaminants at CERN's Large Hadron Collider.

Manufacture is predominantly by subsidiary businesses in Czechoslovakia, South Korea and China. Edwards' global research and development facilities remain in the UK.

Major customers in 2012 included Samsung, Hynix, Agilent and LG.

History

Independent

In 1919, physicist Frederick David (F E) Edwards and his father William founded their eponymous business in Camberwell as Edwards Equipment and Services, importing vacuum equipment from Germany's Leybold.

Cut off from its supplier because of World War II, and with German patents voided in the UK, independent manufacturing began in 1939. The firm was renamed W Edwards and Co in 1940, then Edwards High Vacuum International Ltd in 1950, and moved to Crawley in 1953.

Edwards purchased Italian freeze drying equipment manufacturer Alto Vuoto SpA in 1954, followed by the Shoreham factory of former subcontractor J H Holmes and Son Ltd in 1958.

In the 1960s the firm listed as a public company; suffered from strike action; F E Edwards died, and after financial difficulties it was sold to BOC.

BOC

BOC Group's purchase of Edwards in 1968 was followed by international expansion, particularly into Asia, and investment at the Crawley, Eastbourne, Shoreham and Burgess Hill sites.

In 1984, Edwards developed and patented the first practical high vacuum dry (no-oil) pumps. The design was taken up by the fast growing semiconductor manufacturing market.

Linde and CCMP Capital

New, Cayman Islands holding company Edwards Group Ltd listed on NASDAQ, in 2012 via ADS under ticker symbol EVAC, with a  IPO. It delisted in 2014 when Atlas Copco purchased operating subsidiary Edwards Ltd for £1 billion.

In 2011, manufacturing sites were opened in Czech Republic and South Korea for industrial / pharmaceutical / chemical / scientific, and semiconductor markets respectively. Most of Edwards' UK manufacturing capacity was closed, completing plans proposed under BOC in 2005.

Edwards was awarded its seventh Queen's Award in 2012.

Atlas Copco

Controversies

Domain registration

In 2005, Nominet determined the domain name bocedwards.co.uk had been abusively registered by Eaton Engineering (Herts) Ltd and ordered that it be transferred to The BOC Group Ltd, the then owners of Edwards.

Hoffman Instrumentation Supply Inc

In 2019, Hoffman Instrumentation Supply Inc was a component vendor to Edwards' US, subsidiary Edwards Vacuum LLC, and held talks about becoming exclusive supplier for some items. It was also proposed that Hoffman would construct subassemblies and complete systems, but only for Edwards.

One of Hoffman's key customers enquired whether it could provide a vacuum system that would work with pumps other than Edwards'. Hoffman  informed Edwards whose response was to suggest purchasing Hoffman. Information was provided about Hoffman to Edwards for due diligence, under a non disclosure agreement, in order to progress the acquisition. It included technical specifications for the pump agnostic vacuum system and Hoffman's cost structures.

The parties did not agree terms to purchase Hoffman and Edwards withdrew from the process.

A group of employees left Edwards to work for Hoffman and in 2020, Edwards sought an injunction against Hoffman to prevent misuse of the ex employees's trade secrets.

Hoffman counter claimed Edwards used the confidential due diligence information to pitch their products to Hoffman's key customer at prices just below Hoffman's own intended level, and to demand cost reductions from suppliers to match those obtained by Hoffman.

Hoffman alleged Edwards employed monopoly practices in breach of the Sherman Act because it had 70% share of the integrated vacuum pump frame systems market in the US and suppressed competition, imposing non-compete covenants on its suppliers and engaged in employee intimidation; customer threats, and bad faith litigation.

In May 2021, Edwards was granted a partial, interim injunction against Hoffman selling a bellows component. Judgement declined to accept Edwards' application of Noerr–Pennington doctrine to dismiss Hoffman's anti competition counterclaim. 

In June 2022, the parties entered into a Confidential Settlement Agreement through which both parties' claims were dismissed with prejudice.

Patents

Edwards makes many patent applications which are opposed, and frequently challenges those made by its competitors.

References

External links 
 Official Site

Engineering companies of England
Companies based in Crawley
Pump manufacturers
Vacuum pumps
2014 mergers and acquisitions